Liu Junhong (born 29 May 1969) is a Chinese speed skater. She competed in two events at the 1992 Winter Olympics.

References

1969 births
Living people
Chinese female speed skaters
Olympic speed skaters of China
Speed skaters at the 1992 Winter Olympics
Place of birth missing (living people)